In mathematics, a Hartshorne ellipse is an ellipse in the unit ball bounded by the 4-sphere S4 such that the ellipse and the circle given by intersection of its plane with S4 satisfy the Poncelet condition that there is a triangle with vertices on the circle and edges tangent to the ellipse.

References

Algebraic geometry